George Quentin Chance (born 1904) was an Irish radiologist. His note of 1948 titled "Note on a Type of Flexion Fracture of the Spine", published in the British Journal of Radiology described three cases of fractures across the vertebra and neural arch, the 'Chance fracture'.

Selected publications

References

1904 births
Year of death missing
Irish radiologists
People from Dublin (city)
Date of death unknown